Gareth Carr (born 4 November 1981) is a retired South African field hockey player. He was a defender who often scored from penalty corners.

Carr was a member of the South Africa squad that competed at the 2010 Hockey World Cup and the 2010 Commonwealth Games. He also competed in the Champions Challenge in 2005, 2009 and 2011, and the Hockey Africa Cup of Nations in 2005, 2009 and 2011. Carr retired from international hockey with 81 caps and 50 goals.

Carr was born in Durban. He has played club hockey in the UK for Holcombe, East Grinstead and Old Georgians.

References

External links

1981 births
South African male field hockey players
Field hockey players at the 2010 Commonwealth Games
Commonwealth Games competitors for South Africa
Sportspeople from Durban
Living people
Holcombe Hockey Club players
East Grinstead Hockey Club players
2010 Men's Hockey World Cup players
21st-century South African people